The Paramania Vortex is a French/British paramotor that was designed by Mike Campbell-Jones and produced by Paramania of Le Chillou, France and later of London, England for powered paragliding. Introduced about 2002 and now out of production, when it was available the aircraft was supplied complete and ready-to-fly.

Design and development
The Vortex was designed to comply with the US FAR 103 Ultralight Vehicles rules as well as European regulations. It features a paraglider-style wing, single-place accommodation and a single engine in pusher configuration with a reduction drive and a diameter two-bladed composite propeller. The engine and propeller used varies by model. Early wings used in 2002 included the Paramania Reflex, while this was later developed into the Paramania Action wing by 2004.

As is the case with all paramotors, take-off and landing is accomplished by foot. Inflight steering is accomplished via handles that actuate the canopy brakes, creating roll and yaw.

Variants
Vortex Corsair
Model with a  Cors'Air M21Y engine in pusher configuration with a 2.6:1 ratio reduction drive and a  diameter three-bladed composite propeller.
Vortex Corsair 70X
Model with a  Cors'Air M21Y engine in pusher configuration with a 2.6:1 ratio reduction drive and a  diameter three-bladed composite propeller.
Vortex Solo
Model with a  Solo 210 engine in pusher configuration with a 2.3:1 ratio reduction drive and a  diameter three-bladed composite propeller.

Specifications (Vortex Solo)

References

Vortex
2000s British ultralight aircraft
2000s French ultralight aircraft
Single-engined pusher aircraft
Paramotors